Google Workspace Marketplace (formerly Google Apps Marketplace and then G Suite Marketplace) is a product of Google LLC. It is an online store for free and paid web applications that work with Google Workspace services and with third party software. Apps are based on Google APIs or on Google Apps Script.

References

External links
 

Workspace Marketplace